At the opening of the 118th Congress, the members-elect of the U.S. House elected in the 2022 midterms held an election for speaker of the House, marking the 128th U.S. speaker election since the office was created in 1789. It began on January 3, 2023, and concluded in the early morning hours of January 7 when Kevin McCarthy of California, leader of the House Republican Conference, won a majority of votes cast on the fifteenth ballot. After the longest speaker election since the December 1859 – February 1860 U.S. speaker election, McCarthy won the speakership by making concessions to Republican Party hardliners, who had refused to support him through several rounds of voting for not being sufficiently conservative.

Republicans won a narrow majority of House seats over the Democratic Party in the 2022 elections. McCarthy won the nomination within the Republican conference but faced public opposition from far-right House Republicans before the vote.  The opposition consisted mainly members of the Freedom Caucus. With 19 Republicans voting for candidates other than McCarthy on the 1st ballot, no candidate achieved a majority and the election proceeded to additional ballots for the 1st time since the 1923 U.S. speaker election. In the 1st round of voting, House Democratic Caucus leader Hakeem Jeffries of New York’s 8th congressional district received 212 votes, McCarthy received 203 votes, and Andy Biggs of Arizona’s 5th congressional district received 10 votes; other candidates who weren't formally nominated received 9 votes.

On the 2nd through the 14th votes, McCarthy again failed to receive a majority of votes cast. Jeffries received the support of all Democrats present on each ballot. Most or all of the Republican opposition voted for Jim Jordan of Ohio’s 4th congressional district on the 2nd and 3rd rounds and Byron Donalds of Florida’s 19th congressional district on the 4th through 11th rounds. Kevin Hern of Oklahoma’s 1st congressional district and Donald Trump were also nominated and received votes in various rounds. On the 4th day of voting, January 6, many of the Republicans who opposed McCarthy began voting for him following negotiations between rounds. On the 15th and final ballot, the 6 remaining anti-McCarthy holdouts voted "present", which reduced the threshold of votes needed for a majority from 218 to 215, thus allowing McCarthy to be elected with 216 votes.

Process and conventions 

The speaker is the presiding officer of the U.S. House of Representatives. The House elects its speaker at the beginning of a new Congress (i.e. , after Election Day) or when a speaker dies, resigns, or is removed from the position intra-term. Since 1839, the House has elected speakers by roll call vote. Following a congressional election, there being no speaker, the outgoing clerk of the U.S. House of Representatives summons, convenes, and calls the House to order. After prayer offered by the Chaplain of the House, the clerk leads the representatives in the Pledge of Allegiance before ordering a roll call conducted by the reading clerk. The clerk and its officers then order and oversee the election of a speaker. During these processes, the clerk must "preserve order and decorum and decide all questions of order", which is subject to appeal.

Traditionally, each of the party caucuses and conferences in the U.S. Congress selects a candidate for the speakership from among its senior leaders prior to the roll call. Representatives are not restricted to voting for the candidate nominated by their party but generally do, as the outcome of the election effectively determines which one is the majority party and consequently will organize the House. Without a speaker, members-elect of the House cannot be sworn in. The House is unable to conduct any business other than electing the speaker. Because the rules of the House are adopted for each new Congress, the House will not have rules until the election is complete allowing the members to be sworn in and the House to adopt rules.

Representatives that choose to vote for someone other than their party's nominated candidate usually vote for another member within the party or vote present, which entails abstention. Moreover, as the U.S. Constitution does not explicitly state that the speaker must be an incumbent member of the House. It is permissible for representatives to nominate and vote for someone who is not a member of the House at the time, and non-members have been nominated and received a few votes in various speaker elections over the past several years. Nevertheless, every person elected speaker has been a member. Upon winning election, the new speaker is immediately sworn in by the Dean of the United States House of Representatives, the chamber's longest-serving member. The new speaker then administers the oath en masse to the rest of the members of the House.

To be elected speaker, a candidate must receive a majority of the current votes cast, as opposed to an majority of the entire membership of the House—at the time 218 votes, in a House of 434 members, due to one vacancy caused by the death of Donald McEachin of Virginia. There have only been a few instances during the past century where a person received a majority of the votes cast and thus won the election while failing to obtain a majority of the full membership. It happened most recently in 2021, when Nancy Pelosi was elected with 216 votes (as opposed to 218). Such a variation in the number of votes necessary to win a given election might arise due to vacancies, absentees, or members being present but not voting. If no candidate wins a majority of the votes cast for a person by name, then the roll call is repeated until a speaker is elected. Prior to this election, multiple roll calls have been necessary 14 times; 13 of these occurred before the American Civil War and it last occurred in December 1923, when a closely divided House needed nine ballots to elect Frederick H. Gillett speaker.

Democratic nomination 

During the 2019 U.S. speaker election, Nancy Pelosi struck a deal with certain members in the Democratic caucus that she would retire from the position of speaker after the 2022 U.S. House elections to ensure a majority voted for her. On November 17, 2022, Pelosi confirmed during a speech on the floor of the House that she would not run again for a leadership position.

Candidates

Nominee 
 Hakeem Jeffries, incumbent chair of the House Democratic Caucus, and representative from New York's 8th congressional district

Declined 
 Jim Clyburn, outgoing majority whip, former assistant Democratic leader, and representative from South Carolina's 6th congressional district
 Steny Hoyer, outgoing House Majority Leader and representative from Maryland's 5th congressional district
 Nancy Pelosi, outgoing speaker of the House, former minority leader, and representative from California's 12th congressional district
 Adam Schiff, incumbent chair of the House Intelligence Committee, and representative from California's 28th congressional district
 Pete Aguilar, incumbent vice chair of the Democratic caucus, and representative from California's 31st congressional district
 Katherine Clark, incumbent assistant speaker, former vice chair of the Democratic caucus, and representative from Massachusetts's 5th congressional district

Result 
On November 30, Jeffries was selected by acclamation.

Republican nomination 
In the October 2015 U.S. speaker election, after John Boehner resigned under pressure from conservative hardliners and the Freedom Caucus, Kevin McCarthy ran for the Republican nomination and was initially judged as the party's preferred candidate. As the House Freedom Caucus refused to vote for McCarthy in the full House, he did not hold a majority. McCarthy withdrew from the race, and Paul Ryan was elected speaker.

Candidates

Nominee 
 Kevin McCarthy, former majority and minority leader, and representative from California's 23rd congressional district

Lost nomination 
 Andy Biggs, former chair of the Freedom Caucus and representative from Arizona's 5th congressional district

Results 
The House Republican Conference vote was held on November 15, 2022, and despite a challenge from Biggs, McCarthy won the majority of votes, becoming the Republican nominee for speaker of the House. As McCarthy did not win at least 218 votes, a majority of the seats in the House, it caused media speculation questioning McCarthy's ability to be voted in as Speaker.

Election of the speaker

Overview 
The election for speaker began on January 3, 2023, at the start of the 118th Congress. At the time of the proceedings, there was one vacant seat, Virginia's 4th congressional district.

In anticipation of right-wing opposition to McCarthy's election as speaker, Don Bacon of Nebraska threatened to form a coalition of moderate Republicans who would work with the Democrats to successfully install a speaker. Several names were floated as a potential compromise candidate, the most prominent of which was Fred Upton, a moderate Republican who had been the representative for Michigan's 6th congressional district up to his retirement in the 2022 election cycle. McCarthy and his supporters spent December and the first days of January negotiating with right-wing opponents of McCarthy to persuade them to support him on the floor. At a closed-door meeting shortly before the speaker vote on January 3, Mike Rogers of Alabama threatened dissident Republicans with removal from House committees.

Prior to the vote, Politico reported that at least five Republican representatives had refused to support McCarthy, while another nine had not publicly commented on whether they would. As the Republican Party won a slim majority (222–212) and assuming Democratic members do not vote for him, McCarthy could only sustain as many as four Republican members voting for other candidates or nine Republican members either voting present or not voting at all, for McCarthy to be elected as speaker. Bob Good of Virginia said that McCarthy "has not done anything to earn my vote", explaining that "[t]here's many times where we ... asked him to fight on various opportunities and various issues, and I have not seen the demonstrated fight that we're looking for." The Club for Growth, a conservative political advocacy group, openly called for House Republicans to oppose his nomination.

It was reported that these representatives demanded that McCarthy make concessions before these representatives would support him, such as lowering the barriers for caucus members to force a vote to remove a sitting speaker and other procedural matters. Chip Roy of Texas became a leader in the negotiation process for the holdouts to McCarthy's speakership nomination. The goals that Roy and a group of about 20 Republicans included to bring down the threshold for calling a vote of no confidence against the speaker to one member, more enforcement to allow more time to read bills, a greater role for the House Freedom Caucus in Republican leadership, requiring Republican leadership to refrain from being involved in primary elections, and an end to U.S. aid to Ukraine.

Summary 
On the first through the fourteenth votes, McCarthy failed to receive a majority of votes cast, while Jeffries received the support of all Democrats present on each ballot. Jim Jordan of Ohio received all votes of Republicans opposed to McCarthy on the second and third rounds. Following three unsuccessful votes on January 3, the House adjourned until noon on January 4. During the fourth vote, Roy nominated Byron Donalds of Florida, who replaced Jordan as the Republican alternative to McCarthy. In the fourth ballot until the eleventh ballot, Victoria Spartz of Indiana voted present, lowering the necessary threshold to 217 votes.

Following three more unsuccessful ballots on January 4, the House again adjourned until 8 pm the same day, then voted to adjourn again until noon on January 5. The House reconvened on January 5, and from the seventh to the eleventh ballots no candidate achieved a majority of the vote, making this the longest speaker election since that of December 1859 – February 1860. After initially voting to adjourn the proceedings until the following Monday, seconds before the voting to adjourn closed, McCarthy and his allies reversed their votes, which brought about a fifteenth ballot. On this fifteenth and final ballot, McCarthy received 50.5% of the votes cast for a candidate by name, as all four members-elect who had voted for other candidates on the fourteenth ballot voted present instead. McCarthy was elected speaker, and the early morning of January 7 marked the end of one of the highest number of ballots needed to elect a House Speaker in U.S. history.

Day one (January 3) 

On the first ballot, Elise Stefanik of New York gave a nominating speech for McCarthy, Pete Aguilar of California nominated Jeffries, and Paul Gosar of Arizona nominated Andy Biggs. In total, 19 Republicans voted for candidates other than McCarthy, while Jeffries received the most votes of any candidate with all Democrats present voting in his favor. Since no nominee received an outright majority of the vote, a second ballot took place for the first time since the December 1923 U.S. speaker election.

On the second ballot, Jordan nominated McCarthy, Aguilar again nominated Jeffries, and Matt Gaetz of Florida nominated Jordan. The same 19 Republicans voted against McCarthy, this time coalescing their votes around Jordan. No candidate received an outright majority of the vote.

On the third ballot, Steve Scalise of Louisiana nominated McCarthy, Aguilar again nominated Jeffries, and Roy nominated Jordan. Jordan again voted for McCarthy, not for himself. Byron Donalds of Florida, who had voted for McCarthy on the first two ballots, instead voted for Jordan, increasing Jordan's vote total to 20. Donalds wrote on Twitter about his decision to change his vote, stating that "the reality is Rep. Kevin McCarthy doesn't have the votes."

After the third ballot, Tom Cole of Oklahoma moved to adjourn the meeting until 12:00 p.m. on January 4, and the motion was approved by voice vote.

Day two (January 4) 
Ahead of the fourth ballot of voting on January 4, former president Donald Trump reaffirmed his support for McCarthy to be speaker of the House and urged all House Republicans to vote for him. Kat Cammack of Florida described those who did not vote for McCarthy as "the radical 2 percent". Ralph Norman of South Carolina, one of the Republicans opposed to McCarthy, stated that McCarthy would win over additional votes from the Republican holdouts by committing to shutting down the U.S. government over raising the United States debt ceiling.

After a quorum call, Wisconsin Republican Mike Gallagher nominated McCarthy, Aguilar again nominated Jeffries, and Roy nominated Byron Donalds. Despite Trump's endorsement, the 20 members who had voted for Jordan in the third ballot again opposed McCarthy, voting in this round for Donalds. Victoria Spartz, who had voted for McCarthy on each previous ballot, voted present. Spartz explained her vote of present as a message that more deliberations are needed.

On the fifth ballot, Warren Davidson of Ohio nominated McCarthy, Aguilar again nominated Jeffries, and Lauren Boebert of Colorado nominated Donalds. All members voted for the same candidates on the fifth ballot as they did on the fourth.

On the sixth ballot, Cammack nominated McCarthy, Aguilar again nominated Jeffries, and Scott Perry of Pennsylvania nominated Donalds. Prior to the ballot, Ken Buck of Colorado suggested to CNN that McCarthy should withdraw from consideration for Speaker if he could not reach a majority; he nonetheless voted again for McCarthy. All members voted for the same candidates on the sixth ballot as they did on the fourth and fifth.

The House agreed to adjourn until 8:00 p.m. the same day by voice vote. After reconvening at 8:00, the House agreed to adjourn again until 12:00 p.m. the next day, January 5, by a vote of 216–214. Of those who voted against adjournment, 210 were Democrats and four were Republicans: Biggs, Boebert, Gaetz, and Eli Crane of Arizona. Following the sixth ballot, Politico reported that Donalds was unlikely to be the final choice of the anti-McCarthy Republicans, with the chair of the Republican Study Committee, Kevin Hern of Oklahoma, being floated as a potential candidate. Pete Sessions of Texas also suggested that Republicans should begin to consider other speaker candidates, with Scalise, the House Majority Leader-elect, being specifically named.

Ahead of a seventh vote on the speakership, McCarthy offered several concessions, including allowing a single party member to motion for a vote to remove the speaker, appointing additional Freedom Caucus members to the House Rules Committee, and holding votes on bills concerning congressional term limits in the United States and border security. At the same time, the Congressional Leadership Fund, a super PAC aligned with McCarthy, reached an agreement with the Club for Growth not to spend money in the primary election of Republicans in open districts that are considered safe seats for the party.

Day three (January 5) 

On the seventh ballot, John James of Michigan nominated McCarthy, Aguilar again nominated Jeffries, and Dan Bishop of North Carolina nominated Donalds. Gaetz, who had voted for Donalds on the fourth, fifth, and sixth ballots, instead voted for Trump. All other members voted for the same candidates as they did on the fourth, fifth, and sixth ballots.

On the eighth ballot, Brian Mast of Florida nominated McCarthy, Katherine Clark of Massachusetts nominated Jeffries, and Biggs nominated Donalds. Boebert, as well as Josh Brecheen of Oklahoma, who had both previously supported Donalds, cast their votes for Hern, who was not formally nominated. All other members voted for the same candidates as they did on the seventh ballot.

On the ninth ballot, Troy Nehls of Texas nominated McCarthy, Ted Lieu of California nominated Jeffries, Matt Rosendale of Montana nominated Donalds, and Boebert nominated Hern. All members voted for the same candidates as they did on the eighth ballot, except Gaetz, who voted for Hern instead of Trump. Buck, who had been a McCarthy supporter, was absent from the vote and subsequent votes due to travel for a planned non-emergency medical procedure in Colorado.

On the tenth ballot, Juan Ciscomani of Arizona nominated McCarthy, Aguilar again nominated Jeffries, Anna Paulina Luna of Florida nominated Donalds, and Boebert again nominated Hern. Donalds continued as the main Republican opposition to McCarthy, while Hern was nominated for the ninth, tenth, and eleventh ballots, receiving as many as seven votes.

On the eleventh ballot, French Hill of Arkansas nominated McCarthy, Joe Neguse of Colorado nominated Jeffries, Gaetz nominated Trump, and Good nominated Hern. After the ballot, the House voted 219−213 to adjourn until 12:00 p.m. on January 6. Tim Burchett of Tennessee joined all Democrats in voting against adjournment. McCarthy continued to negotiate with the Republican hardliners with further concessions, including seats on influential committees (such as the Rules Committee) and lowering the threshold to a single House member for triggering a vote on whether to unseat the speaker.

Day four (January 6) 

When the House reconvened on January 6, Mike Garcia of California nominated McCarthy for the twelfth ballot. Jim Clyburn of South Carolina nominated Jeffries, Gaetz nominated Jordan, and Boebert again nominated Hern. On the twelfth ballot, 14 Republicans who had previously opposed McCarthy voted for him, while seven others voted for Jordan or Hern. Buck, David Trone of Maryland, and Wesley Hunt of Texas were absent. Buck and Trone were absent due to scheduled medical procedures; Hunt returned to Texas because his wife was in a hospital following the premature birth of their son. This ballot marked the first time McCarthy won a plurality of the votes, after receiving votes from 14 Republicans who had previously opposed his nomination; he nonetheless fell short of a majority.

On the thirteenth ballot, James Comer of Kentucky nominated McCarthy and Veronica Escobar of Texas nominated Jeffries. For the first time, there were no other nominations. Andy Harris of Maryland voted for McCarthy for the first time on this ballot. This left only six Republicans who did not vote for McCarthy. Trone, who was absent on the previous ballot due to undergoing shoulder surgery that morning, returned to the House to continue voting for Jeffries. The House then voted 220–212 on a party-line vote to adjourn until 10:00 p.m., allowing time for the two absent Republicans to return to Congress. Scalise proposed the motion.

When the House reconvened at 10 p.m., Patrick McHenry of North Carolina nominated McCarthy and Aguilar again nominated Jeffries on the fourteenth ballot. Boebert and Gaetz voted present, Buck and Hunt returned to vote for McCarthy, and four Republicans voted against McCarthy, with two votes for Biggs and two votes for Jordan. McCarthy, who was one vote short of becoming speaker, approached Boebert and Gaetz on the floor and attempted unsuccessfully to convince them to vote for him. As Rogers was arguing with Gaetz, he had to be physically restrained by Richard Hudson of North Carolina. According to The New York Times, Gaetz was seeking a subcommittee chairmanship in the House Armed Services Committee, of which Rogers was in line to become chairman.

The House then proceeded to vote on a motion to adjourn until 12 p.m. on January 9, with McHenry making the motion to adjourn. The plan was to give time to convince the four Republicans who continued to vote for someone other than McCarthy on the 14th ballot to switch their votes to present in order to lower the threshold needed to elect a speaker. It was determined that the plan would not be able to yield a winner if executed on January 9 because a couple of Republicans were unable to attend the session on that day due to family obligations. Marjorie Taylor Greene of Georgia then called Donald Trump on her cell phone, and passed the phone around to the members-elect who continued to refuse to vote for McCarthy. The remaining holdout Republicans eventually agreed to switch their votes, and as a result many Republicans, including McCarthy, scrambled to change their vote from supporting adjournment to opposing it in hopes of a successful fifteenth ballot to take place immediately. As the vote to adjourn drew to a close, many members began to chant "One more time!" Due to the Republicans' switch, the motion failed 155−279, and the House remained in session; 67 Republicans were counted in opposition of adjournment, joined by all Democrats.

On the fifteenth ballot, Bruce Westerman of Arkansas nominated McCarthy and Dean Phillips of Minnesota nominated Jeffries. The final vote began at 11:50 p.m., and the threshold of 215 members present and voting needed for a majority (excluding those present and not voting) was reached at 12:29 a.m. With a majority of votes cast, McCarthy was elected speaker at 12:37 a.m. after the results were read by the clerk.

Following the election, Hal Rogers of Kentucky, the House dean, administered the oath of office to McCarthy as speaker, and McCarthy swore in all members of the House en masse. The House then agreed at 1:52 a.m. to adjourn until 5:00 p.m. on January 9 by voice vote, without any audible opposition.

Votes cast by members 
All House members of the 118th Congress voted for their party's nominee on every ballot except as noted here.

Summary of the votes

Impact 

Thirteen of the fourteen prior U.S. speaker elections that took more than one ballot occurred before the American Civil War. The 68th Congress in 1923 was the last time it took more than one ballot to elect a speaker, and the 36th Congress in 1859 was the last time it took more than nine ballots to elect a speaker. The record number is 133 ballots during the 34th Congress in 1855, with this election having the fifth-highest number of ballots. In 2023, the election results and its length causing instability were widely reported by media around the world.

Consequences while there was no speaker 
While the House was without a speaker, Congress could not pass bills or adopt resolutions. Incoming members could not set up their constituent services and were barred from accessing their security clearances. The speaker's place in the U.S. presidential line of succession was skipped, and the president pro tempore of the U.S. Senate (in 2023, Patty Murray of Washington) became second in the line after the vice president (Kamala Harris of California).

Moreover, the government of the District of Columbia was unable to enact any laws. Because the District of Columbia Home Rule Act specifies that laws passed by the district are subject to a congressional review period before becoming law, the district must hand-deliver physical copies of the laws to both the Senate's president pro tempore and the House's speaker. Therefore, with no speaker to receive the copies, the congressional review period could not begin.

C-SPAN popularity 
C-SPAN, an American non-governmental cable and satellite television network that televises proceedings of the House, was approved before the speaker election to operate its cameras with its own staff, free of the restrictions by government employees who usually provide its feed. This deviation from its typical broadcast style captured members huddled and reaction shots that viewers do not normally see. C-SPAN aired extremely unlikely conversations between unaligned members, such as Gosar and Alexandria Ocasio-Cortez of New York, and focused on George Santos of New York, a newly elected Republican member accused of lying about much of his biography. The network saw increased popularity as it broadcast the election.

On January 8, Roy, one of the Republicans who held out on voting for McCarthy, stated that C-SPAN's increased independence was a good thing and that he may be open to it being permanent. The restrictions traditionally placed upon C-SPAN went back into effect after the House established its rules. Gaetz, another Republican holdout, introduced an amendment that would allow C-SPAN "to broadcast and record the floor proceedings of the House with not less than 4 cameras owned and operated by [them]". C-SPAN also submitted a formal petition to McCarthy to give it more independence. Democrat Maxwell Frost of Florida also announced his support for C-SPAN's requests.

Notes

References 

Speaker of the House election
 Speaker
Speaker of the House election
Speaker of the House election
2023
Speaker of the House election